Viscount Tenby, of Bulford in the County of Pembroke, is a hereditary title in the Peerage of the United Kingdom, created in 1957 for former Home Secretary, the Hon. Gwilym Lloyd George, second son of Prime Minister David Lloyd George, 1st Earl Lloyd-George of Dwyfor (see Earl Lloyd-George of Dwyfor for earlier history of the family).

 the title is held by his younger son, the third Viscount, who succeeded his elder brother in 1983. Lord Tenby was one of the ninety elected hereditary peers to remain in the House of Lords after the House of Lords Act 1999, sitting as a crossbencher until he stood down from parliament in 2014 (being replaced by the Lord Mountevans).

As a grandson of the first Earl Lloyd-George of Dwyfor, he is also in remainder to this peerage and its subsidiary titles.

Viscounts Tenby (1957)
Gwilym Lloyd George, 1st Viscount Tenby (1894–1967)
David Lloyd George, 2nd Viscount Tenby (1922–1983)
William Lloyd George, 3rd Viscount Tenby (born 1927)

The heir apparent is the present holder's son, the Hon. Timothy Henry Gwilym Lloyd George (born 1962).

See also
Earl Lloyd-George of Dwyfor

Notes

External links
 www.debretts.com Kidd, Charles & Williamson, David (editors). Debrett's Peerage and Baronetage (1990 edition). New York: St Martin's Press.

Viscountcies in the Peerage of the United Kingdom
Noble titles created in 1957
Noble titles created for UK MPs